Elections to the newly created Cheshire West and Chester Council took place on 1 May 2008. Elections occurred in all 24 wards, with each ward returning 3 councillors to the council. The wards are identical to the former Cheshire County Council wards.

From May 2008 until April 2009, the elected members formed a "shadow" council, which made preparations for the changeover from the county and borough structure to the new unitary authority structure. Thereafter, the members would serve for two years from May 2009. The next elections were held in May 2011.

Results summary

The Conservative Party took control of the council, with a majority of 38 councillors.

After the election, the composition of the council was;

Conservative 55
Labour 13
Liberal Democrat 4

Results by ward

Abbey

Blacon

Boughton Heath and Vicars Cross

Broxton

Central and Westminster

City

Eddisbury

Frodsham and Helsby

Gowy

Grange and Rossmore

Groves and Whitby

Hoole and Newton

Ledsham and Willaston

Marbury

Mickle Trafford

Neston and Parkgate

Northwich East and Shakerley

Northwich West

Overleigh

Sutton and Manor

Upton

Weaver

Winsford North and East

Winsford South and West

References

External links
Cheshire West and Chester 2008 election nominations

2008 English local elections
2008
2000s in Cheshire